John Washington  (1 January 1800 – 16 September 1863) was an officer of the Royal Navy, Hydrographer of the Navy, and a founding member of the Royal Geographical Society of London.

Early career 
Washington joined the Royal Navy in May 1812, and served aboard  with Sir George Cockburn's fleet in Chesapeake Bay, seeing much action in the War of 1812. From October 1813, he was aboard , which was sent to cruise off Greenland in 1814. On this voyage he learnt much about astromomical and magnetic observations from the Master of the ship, William Bain (Later Sir William). He joined the Royal Naval Academy in November 1814, and graduated in May 1816. He was promoted to lieutenant on 1 January 1821, while based at Valparaíso. He obtained permission to return to England by his own route, and took the track later followed by Darwin riding over the Andes to Mendoza and then across the pampas to Buenos Aires.
 
He spent this time travelling in France, Spain, and Italy, and improving his knowledge of the languages of these countries. During the winter of 1829-1830 he was exploring and making astronomical observations in Morocco, publishing an account of his travels in 1831. From 1830 to 1833, he was flag lieutenant to Sir John Beresford, Commander-in-Chief, The Nore, and on 14 August 1833, Washington was promoted to the rank of commander. He was one of the original members of the Royal Geographical Society and served as its secretary from 1836 to 1841. In 1838 he published an account of Mohammedu-Siseï, a Mandingo from The Gambia, who had been enslaved, freed, and served as a soldier in the West Indian Regiment. Washington met him in London, and his account describes aspects of Islamic religion and culture in the West Indies.

Surveying 

Washington's surveying career began in March 1841 with his first command, the paddle steamer . He took over the North Sea survey after the death of William Hewett, whose ship HMS Fairy was lost with all hands in a storm in 1840. In January 1842, he was temporarily lent to the yacht , which was appointed to bring Frederick William IV of Prussia to England. Washington was made captain on 16 March 1842. In January 1843, he was moved to another paddler, in which he continued the survey of the east coast of England until 1847. An important part of Washington's work in the North Sea was confirming Hewett's observation of a point with neither rise nor fall of the tide. This had been predicted by William Whewell, and is now known as an amphidromic point. The east coast of Enland is characterised by many shifting channels in shallow waters. An example is The New Stanford Channel near Lowestoft,  a new channel useful for navigation, which Washington documented in 1843.

Harbours and life-boats
Washington's surveying on the east coast included work on harbours. In 1844 he published an account of the changes that had occurred at Harwich, including accelerating encroachment of the sea on the western side of the harbour entrance, with resulting changes in currents and silting up of useful approach channels. He attributed this to the quarrying of cement stone from the cliffs, estimating that at least a million tons had been removeds since 1812. He recommended remedies including abolition of quarrying and the construction of a breakwater. He was one of the commissioners appointed to investigate the subject of harbours of refuge,  and in January 1845 he was appointed a commissioner for inquiring into the state of the rivers, shores, and harbours of the United Kingdom. In February of the same year he was elected a Fellow of the Royal Society. After completing his work in the North Sea, he was employed in the railway and harbour department of the admiralty. 

In 1850, supported by the Duke of Northumberland, Washington launched a competition for the design of a new life-boat, with a prize of 100 guineas (£105). A committee was set up to judge the entries, with Washington as chairman, and produced a report the following year, which included illustrations of the most promising designs, and also a chart marking the wrecks round the coasts of Britain and Ireland in 1850. The winning design, with modifications after testing, was adopted by the Nationl Life-Boat Institution.

War and Hydrographer
In 1853, having to visit Denmark, Sweden, and Russia to settle some matters as to an establishment of lifeboats, he was directed by Sir James Graham, then First Lord of the Admiralty, to collect what information he could as to the state of the Russian Baltic Fleet and the defences of Kronstadt, Reval, and Sveaborg. Washington carried this out, and was able to see a division of the Russian fleet at sea and observe its manœuvres. He was able to see every ship of the Russian fleet, and also collected copies of Russian nautical charts, which were later used by British and French squadrons in the War with Russia which started later that year. 

During these years he had been acting as assistant to Sir Francis Beaufort, the Hydrographer of the Navy; and on Beaufort's resignation in 1855, Washington was appointed as his successor. His term as Hydrographer began in wartime, and the first priority, already underway while he was Beaufort's assistant, was the supply of charts, particularly to the French Navy. 70,000 more charts had been issued in 1854 than in 1852. The Second China War and the prospect of war with Japan led to shipments of charts of Asia. After the war with Russia was over, Washington turned his attention to the production and sale of charts. Beaufort had insisted on personally inspecting every chart before it was published, and this had led to delays and a backlog of unpublished charts. Washington accepted the need for careful review, but delegated this work to naval assistants, initially to Captain A.B. Becher, then increasingly to more junior assistants. Chart production and distribution were also re-organised, printing being  outsourced to Messrs. Malby and Sons, and the sale of charts by agents and the updating and correction of stock regularised. In the 1864 catalogue, 2,500 charts were listed, a 20% increase since 1855. Sales revenue also increased. Surveying activity was also increased, with more surveys ongoing than at any time before or since. A new initiative during this period was deep-sea sounding in preparation for the laying of long-distance telegraph cables. The first submarine cable had been laid between Dover and Calais in 1850, but cables beyond the continental shelf presented much greater difficulties. Several possible routes for  transatlantic cable were surveyed by Lieutenant Dayman, though the first successful cable was not laid until after Washington's death.

Washington pioneered a major major change in naval organisation concerning the role of Masters. These trained specialists were responsible for the navigation of all but the smallest ships, but although they had great responsibility, and were sometimes in command of ships, they were not of officer rank. Although a few masters did become officers, there was no accepted promotion path. The reforms advocated by Washington led to the creation of a new officer rank of Navigating Lieutenant, and over a period all masters were transferred to this rank or became staff commanders.

Washington gave considerable assistance to David Livingstone's Zambezi expedition of 1858-1864, providing personnel and craft, and there was frequent correspondence between him and Livingstone during the expedition.

Death and funeral
Washington was promoted to the rank of rear-admiral on 12 April 1862. In the following year he became ill, and travelled to Le Havre, then to Switzerland. He returned to Le Havre and died there. His funeral in Le Havre, on the 19th September was attended by French civil, and miltary representativess as well as by British seamen and townspeople.

References 

1800 births
1863 deaths
English hydrographers
Fellows of the Royal Society
Hydrographers of the Royal Navy
Royal Navy admirals
Royal Navy personnel of the Napoleonic Wars